The Debian System is a 2005 non-fiction book written by Martin Krafft which deals exclusively with Debian Linux, detailing its internal workings. The book is mostly for the experienced users seeking in-depth technical knowledge, rather than for beginners.

The author's native language is German but he decided to write it in Debian's de facto language which is English.

The book was written for publication by Open Source Press and later licensed for co-publication by No Starch Press. The English version is thus released under two different ISBNs:
 , available only in central Europe.
 , available worldwide, notable for its cover featuring a surfing cow.

Due to popular demand, the book was later translated to German, Japanese, and French. A Chinese translation is in the works, and other languages are planned:
 German edition, translated by Ute Hertzog and Martin Krafft
 Japanese edition, translated by Kenshi Muto and Junichi Uekawa]
 French edition, translated by Raphaël Hertzog and Roland Mas

External links
 
 
 

Debian
2005 non-fiction books
No Starch Press books
Books about Linux